Slavkov may refer to:

Places in the Czech Republic
Slavkov (Opava District), a municipality and village in the Moravian-Silesian Region
Slavkov (Uherské Hradiště District), a municipality and village in the Zlín Region
Slavkov, a village and part of Bohdalovice in the South Bohemian Region
Slavkov, a village and part of Kozlov (Olomouc District) in the Olomouc Region
Slavkov Forest, a geomorphological region
Slavkov pod Hostýnem, a municipality and village in the Zlín Region
Slavkov u Brna, a town in the South Moravian Region
Slavkov Castle in Slavkov u Brna
Horní Slavkov, a town in the Karlovy Vary Region

Places in Slovakia
Nižný Slavkov, a municipality and village
Malý Slavkov, a municipality and village
Veľký Slavkov, a municipality and village
Vyšný Slavkov, a municipality and village

Other
Slavkov (surname)
Slavkov Declaration, a cooperation between the Czech Republic, Slovakia and Austria